Sunset Grill is a 1993 American neo-noir mystery film directed by Kevin Connor and starring Peter Weller as a private detective in Los Angeles. It co-stars Lori Singer and Stacy Keach.

Plot 
Ryder Hart (Peter Weller) is a private investigator and former police officer who is down on his luck and drinks too much alcohol. His estranged wife Anita (Alexandra Paul) runs the Sunset Grill, a bar and restaurant. Anita is romantically involved with Jeff Carruthers (Michael Anderson, Jr.), a Los Angeles police detective who formerly worked with Hart.

Carruthers introduces Hart to a wealthy businessman Harrison Shelgrove (Stacy Keach) and his alluring assistant Loren (Lori Singer). When someone close to them is murdered, Hart and Carruthers team up to try to solve the crime.

In the course of their investigation, they uncover another mystery involving illegal immigrants from Mexico, including two who worked at the Sunset Grill.

Cast 
 Peter Weller as Ryder Hart, a private detective with a drinking problem
 Lori Singer as Loren, assistant to Harrison Shelgrove
 Stacy Keach as Harrison Shelgrove, a wealthy oil executive and philanthropist
 Alexandra Paul as Anita, Hart's estranged wife
 John Rhys-Davies as Stockton, a corrupt Immigration and Naturalization Service (INS) officer
 Michael Anderson, Jr. as Jeff Carruthers, a police lieutenant and Anita's love interest
 Randy Pelish as Dr. Tarbus, a medical researcher whose work is financed by Shelgrove
 Pete Koch as Christian, a thug
 Michael Medeiros as Mule, a thug who works with Christian
 Richard Coca as Ricardo, an employee of the Sunset Grill restaurant and bar
 Michael Fernandes as Ramon, a leader of the undocumented immigrant community
 Kelly Jo Minter as Joanna Ramirez, an INS officer and Stockton's partner
 Daniel Addes as Victor
 Benito Martinez as Guillermo, an employee of the Sunset Grill 
 Woodford Croft as Mr. Pietrowski, a client of Hart
 Sandra Wild as Mrs. Pietrowski, the subject of one of Hart's investigations

References

1993 films
American mystery films
American independent films
American neo-noir films
American erotic thriller films
Films directed by Kevin Connor
Films scored by Ken Thorne
1990s English-language films
1990s American films